Rafael Arévalo Martínez (25 July 1884, Guatemala City –12 June 1975, Guatemala City) was a Guatemalan writer.  He was a novelist, short-story writer, poet, diplomat, and director of Guatemala’s national library for more than 20 years. Though Arévalo Martínez’s fame has waned, he is still considered important because of his short stories, and one in particular: The man who resembled a horse and the biography of president Manuel Estrada Cabrera, ¡Ecce Pericles!. Arévalo Martínez was director of the Guatemalan National Library from 1926 until 1946, when he became for a year Guatemala’s representative before the Pan American Union in Washington, D.C. He was the political and literary counterpart of his more famous countryman, Nobel Prize winner Miguel Ángel Asturias; while Arévalo Martínez was an unapologetic admirer of the United States, Asturias was a bitter critic of the New Orleans-based United Fruit Company (now part of United Brands Company), which he felt had plundered his country.

Biography

Arévalo Martinez was a shy child, prone to sickness but with acute talent. His mother took care of him, given that his father died when he was only four years old. He attended Nia Chon and  San José de los Infantes, schools, but could not even finish high school due to his health problems.

Along with artist, writers and poets like Carlos Mérida, Rafael Rodríguez Padilla, Rafael Yela Günther, Carlos Valenti, and Carlos Wyld Ospina among others, worked very closely with Jaime Sabartés, a Spaniard that arrived to Guatemala in 1906 from Barcelona, where he was a close friend of Pablo Picasso; the group was known as the "1910 generation". Arévalo Martínez and the other members of his generation were crucial for the literature and arts of the 20th century in Central America as they abandoned Modernism in search of new trends. Later on Arévalo Martínez created his own style, although there are a number of Guatemalan writers that are grateful for his grammar advice.

Arévalo Martinez worked both prose and poetry.  His first literary work appeared in 1905 when his first poem was printed in a newspaper, and in 1908 he published Woman and children for the Electra magazine contest, that he won.  In 1911, along with Jaime Sabartés decided to rent with their wives a house to save for both families. With Francisco Fernández Hall in 1913 founded was editor in chief of the magazine Juan Chapín, main outlet for the "1910 generation". He wrote for several newspapers and magazines, both nationally and internationally; In 1916, Arévalo Martínez lived for a while in Tegucigalpa where he was working as editor in chief for El Nuevo Tiempo, but went back to Guatemala a few months later. Over there, he was named secretary of the Central American Office, where he had already worked editing their magazine in 1915.  In 1921 he was appointed as correspondent for the Real Academia Española and on 15 September 1922, along with Alejandro Córdova, Carlos Wyld Ospina and Porfirio Barba Jacob founded the newspaper El Imparcial.

He was president of the "Ateneo Guatemalteco", director of the National Library for almost twenty years and in 1945 he was named the Guatemalan detalate before the Pan American Union and director of the Mexican Library in Guatemala.

Writing
Arévalo Martínez's best book of poems was Las rosas de Engaddí (1923; "The Roses of Engaddí"), but he is not remembered as a poet. He published two interconnected utopian novels, El mundo de Los Maharachías (1938; "The World of the Maharachías") and Viaje a Ipanda (1939; "A Voyage to Ipanda"). In the first novel a shipwrecked man named Manuol [sic] finds a civilization of creatures that resemble monkeys but are superior to men. The Maharachías' sensitive tails are almost spiritual. In the second novel the tone is more intellectual and political, and the result is less satisfactory.
Arévalo Martínez is remembered mostly for the title story of his collection El hombre que parecía un caballo (1920; "The Man Who Resembled a Horse"), which was once considered the most famous Latin American short story of the 20th century. First published in 1915, the story was so successful that Arévalo made other experiments in the same vein. These "psychozoological stories," as he called them (probably remembering Kipling), involve a dog or a lioness or some other animal. "The Man Who Resembled a Horse" purports to be the satirical portrait of Colombian poet Porfirio Barba Jacob, who is given the character of a blaspheming, egotistical, and amoral man. The story's power lies in the delirious and oblique account of homoerotic desire. The protagonist's resemblance to a horse embraces his graceful, yet brutal sexuality and his total disregard for morality. The story is deliberately decadent, luxuriant in tone, and its version of sexual desire owes much to Friedrich Nietzsche and Sigmund Freud, who were very popular at the time Arévalo Martínez wrote it.
Roberto González Echevarría

List of works

Narrative
 Una vida, 1914
 El hombre que parecía un caballo, 1914
 El trovador colombiano, 1920
 El señor Monitot, 1922
 La oficina de paz de Orolandia, 1925
 El mundo de los maharachías, 1938
 Viaje a Ipanda, 1939
 Manuel Aldano, 1914 (teatro)
 Ecce Pericles (biography of Manuel Estrada Cabrera)

Poetry
 Maya, 1911
 Los Atormentados, 1914
 Las rosas de Engaddi, 1927
 Por un caminito así, 1947
 "Entregate por entero",  1950

Notes and references

References

Bibliography

Works by Arévalo Martínez

External links
Rafael Arevalo Martinez (Guatemalan writer) – Encyclopædia Britannica

1884 births
1975 deaths
Guatemalan novelists
Male novelists
20th-century Guatemalan poets
20th-century male writers
Guatemalan male poets